Viktoriv is a village in Ivano-Frankivsk Raion, Ivano-Frankivsk Oblast, Ukraine. It belongs to Halych urban hromada, one of the hromadas of Ukraine. The village's population is 1881.

Until 18 July 2020, Viktoriv belonged to Halych Raion. The raion was abolished in July 2020 as part of the administrative reform of Ukraine, which reduced the number of raions of Ivano-Frankivsk Oblast to six. The area of Halych Raion was merged into Ivano-Frankivsk Raion.

References 

Villages in Ivano-Frankivsk Raion